Sir Philip Nicholas Outram Pullman  (born 19 October 1946) is an English writer. His books include the fantasy trilogy His Dark Materials and The Good Man Jesus and the Scoundrel Christ, a fictionalised biography of Jesus. In 2008, The Times named Pullman one of the "50 greatest British writers since 1945". In a 2004 BBC poll, he was named the eleventh most influential person in British culture. He was knighted in the 2019 New Year Honours for services to literature.

Northern Lights, the first volume in His Dark Materials, won the 1995 Carnegie Medal of the Library Association as the year's outstanding English-language children's book. For the 70th anniversary it was named in the top ten by a panel composing the public election for an all-time favourite. It won the public vote from the shortlist and was named all-time "Carnegie of Carnegies" in June 2007. It was filmed under the book's US title, The Golden Compass. In 2003, His Dark Materials trilogy ranked third in the BBC's The Big Read, a poll of 200 top novels voted by the British public.

Life and career
Philip Pullman was born in Norwich, England, the son of Audrey Evelyn Pullman (née Merrifield) and Royal Air Force pilot Alfred Outram Pullman. The family travelled with his father's job, including to Southern Rhodesia, though most of his formative years were spent in Llanbedr in Ardudwy, Wales.

In 1954, when Pullman was seven, his father, an RAF pilot, was killed in a plane crash in Kenya, being posthumously awarded the Distinguished Flying Cross (DFC). In an exchange with a journalist in 2008, Pullman said that, as a boy, he saw his father as "a hero, steeped in glamour, killed in action defending his country", and who had been "training pilots". Pullman was then presented with a report from The London Gazette of 1954 "which carried the official RAF news of the day [and] said that the medal was given for 'gallant and distinguished service' during the Mau Mau uprising. 'The main task of the Harvards [the aircraft flown by his father's unit] had been bombing and machine-gunning Mau Mau and their hideouts in densely wooded and difficult country.' This included 'diving steeply into the gorges of [various] rivers, often in conditions of low cloud and driving rain.' Testing conditions, yes, but not much opposition from the enemy, the journalist in the exchange continued. Very few of the Mau Mau had guns that could land a blow on an aircraft."

Responding to that new information, Pullman wrote: "My father probably doesn't come out of this with very much credit, judged by the standards of modern liberal progressive thought", and he accepted the revelation as "a serious challenge to his childhood memory." In the 2017 BBC series documentary Imagine, Pullman said that he has since become aware that his father could have crashed his plane deliberately, saying "There was something odd about the crash ... he just took his plane up and flew into the side of a hill", citing rumours of his father having debt troubles and a problematic love affair. His mother remarried the following year and, following a move to North Wales, Pullman discovered comic books, including Superman and Batman, a medium which he continues to enjoy.

In his early years, Pullman attended Taverham Hall School and Eaton House and, from 1957, he was educated at Ysgol Ardudwy in Harlech, Gwynedd, spending time in Norfolk with his grandfather, a clergyman. Around that time, Pullman discovered John Milton's Paradise Lost, which would become a major influence for His Dark Materials.

From 1965, Pullman attended Exeter College, Oxford, receiving a Third-class BA in 1968. In an interview with the Oxford Student, he noted that he "did not really enjoy the English course", and that "I thought I was doing quite well until I came out with my third class degree and then I realised that I wasn't – it was the year they stopped giving fourth class degrees otherwise I'd have got one of those". He discovered William Blake's illustrations around 1970, which would also influence him greatly.

Pullman married Judith Speller in 1970 and they have two sons. At the time of his marriage he began teaching children aged 9 to 13 at Bishop Kirk Middle School in Summertown, North Oxford, as well as writing school plays.

His first published work was The Haunted Storm, which was joint-winner of the New English Library's Young Writer's Award in 1972, but which he refuses to discuss. Galatea, an adult fantasy-fiction novel, followed in 1978, but it was his school plays which inspired his first children's book, Count Karlstein, in 1982. He stopped teaching shortly after the publication of his second children's book, The Ruby in the Smoke (1986), which has a Victorian setting.

Between 1988 and 1996, Pullman taught part-time at Westminster College, Oxford, continuing to write children's stories. He began His Dark Materials in about 1993. The first book, Northern Lights, was published in 1995 (entitled The Golden Compass in the U.S., 1996). Pullman won both the annual Carnegie Medal and the Guardian Children's Fiction Prize, a similar award that authors may not win twice.

Pullman has been writing full-time since 1996. He continues to deliver talks and writes occasionally for The Guardian, including writing and lecturing about education, in which he is often critical of unimaginative education policies. He was awarded a CBE in the New Year's Honours list in 2004. He also co-judged the Christopher Tower Poetry Prize (awarded by Oxford University) in 2005 with Gillian Clarke. In 2004, he was elected President of the Blake Society. In 2004 Pullman also guest-edited The Mays Anthology, a collection of new writing from students at the Universities of Oxford and Cambridge.

In 2005, Pullman won the annual Astrid Lindgren Memorial Award from the Swedish Arts Council, recognising his career contribution to "children's and young adult literature in the broadest sense". According to the presentation, "Pullman radically injects new life into fantasy by introducing a variety of alternative worlds and by allowing good and evil to become ambiguous." In every genre, "he combines storytelling and psychological insight of the highest order."

In 2006, he was one of five finalists for the biennial, international Hans Christian Andersen Medal, and he was the British nominee again in 2012.

In 2008, he started working on The Book of Dust, a companion trilogy to his His Dark Materials, and "The Adventures of John Blake", a story for the British children's comic The DFC, with artist John Aggs.

On 23 November 2007, Pullman was made an honorary professor at Bangor University. In June 2008, he became a fellow supporting the MA in creative writing at Oxford Brookes University. In September 2008, he hosted "The Writer's Table" for Waterstone's bookshop chain, highlighting 40 books which have influenced his career. In October 2009, he became a patron of the Palestine Festival of Literature. He is also a patron of the Shakespeare Schools Festival, a charity that enables school children across the UK to perform Shakespeare in professional theatres

On 24 June 2009, Pullman was awarded the degree of D.Litt. (Doctor of Letters), honoris causa, by the University of Oxford at the Encænia ceremony in the Sheldonian Theatre.

In 2012, during a break from writing The Book of Dust, Pullman was asked by Penguin Classics to curate 50 of Grimms' classic fairytales, from their compendium of over 200 stories. "They are not all of the same quality", said Pullman. "Some are easily much better than others. And some are obvious classics. You can't do a selected Grimms' without Rumpelstiltskin, Cinderella and so on."

In 2013, Pullman was elected President of the Society of Authors – the "ultimate honour" awarded by the British writers' body, and a position first held by Alfred, Lord Tennyson.

On 19 October 2017, the first volume of The Book of Dust was published by Penguin Random House Children's and David Fickling in the UK and by Random House Children's in the US. The second title in The Book of Dust, The Secret Commonwealth, published in October 2019, includes a character named after Nur Huda el-Wahabi, a 16-year-old victim of London's Grenfell Tower fire. As part of the charity auction Authors for Grenfell Tower, Pullman offered the highest bidder a chance to name a character in the upcoming trilogy. Ultimately, he raised £32,400.

Pullman was named a Knight Bachelor in the 2019 New Year's Honours list. In March 2019, the charity Action for Children's Art presented Pullman with their annual J. M. Barrie Award to mark a "lifetime's achievement in delighting children".

A lifelong fan of Norwich City F.C., Pullman penned the foreword to the club's official history, published in 2020.

His Dark Materials

His Dark Materials is a trilogy consisting of Northern Lights (titled The Golden Compass in North America), The Subtle Knife and The Amber Spyglass. Northern Lights won the Carnegie Medal for children's fiction in the UK in 1995. The Amber Spyglass was awarded both 2001 Whitbread Prize for best children's book and the Whitbread Book of the Year prize in January 2002, the first children's book to receive that award. The series won popular acclaim in late 2003, taking third place in the BBC's Big Read poll. Pullman has written two companion pieces to the trilogy, Lyra's Oxford and Once Upon a Time in the North. He refers to a third, which will expand his character Will Parry, as the "green book".

The Book of Dust, another trilogy, includes characters and events from His Dark Materials. Pullman has said that the new series is neither sequel, nor prequel, but an "equel". The first book, La Belle Sauvage, was published in October 2017 and the second book, The Secret Commonwealth, in October 2019.

Pullman has narrated unabridged audiobooks of the three novels in the His Dark Materials trilogy; the other parts are read by actors, including Jo Wyatt, Steven Webb, Peter England, Stephen Thorne and Douglas Blackwell.

In a discussion on fantasy as escapism, Pullman admitted he never reads fantasy as "it's not satisfying". He then went on to argue that he sees His Dark Materials as "stark realism", not fantasy.

Campaigns and views
Pullman has been a vocal campaigner on a number of issues related to books and politics.

Views on fantasy 
In a lecture at the Sea of Faith conference, Pullman said that "the writers we call the greatest of all - Shakespeare, Tolstoy, Proust, George Eliot herself, are those who have created the most lifelike simulacra of real human beings in real human situations. In fact the more profound and powerful the imagination, the closer to reality are the forms it dreams up." He said he wanted to write fantasy realistically, or write fantastic characters with psychological depth: "Because when I thought about it, there was no reason why fantasy shouldn't be realistic, in a psychological sense - and it was the lack of that sort of realism that I objected to in the work of the big Tolkien and all the little Tolkiens." He says David Lindsay's A Voyage to Arcturus "shows that fantasy is capable of saying big and important things." He concludes that fantasy is "a great vehicle when it serves the purposes of realism, and a lot of old cobblers when it doesn't." He has praised fantasy authors like Alan Garner and Neil Gaiman.

Views on children's literature 
Pullman believes that children deserve quality literature, and that there isn't a clear demarcation between children's and adult literature. In a talk at the Royal Society of Literature, he quoted C. S. Lewis in “On Three Ways of Writing for Children”: “I now like hock, which I am sure I should not have liked as a child. But I still like lemon-squash. I call this growth or development because I have been enriched: where I formerly had only one pleasure, I now have two.” He says that "It would be nice to think that normal human curiosity would let us open our minds to experience from every quarter, to listen to every storyteller in the marketplace. It would be nice too, occasionally, to read a review of an adult book that said, 'This book is so interesting, and so clearly and beautifully written, that children would enjoy it as well.'" He is an admirer of Philippa Pearce; when Pullman's Northern Lights won the Carnegie of Carnegies, Pearce's Tom's Midnight Garden was the runner-up. Pullman said "Personally, I feel they got the initials right but not the name. I don't know if the result would be the same in a hundred years' time; maybe Philippa Pearce would win then." In 2011, Pullman gave the Philippa Pearce lecture. He is also an admirer of Leon Garfield, "someone who put the best of his imagination into everything he wrote", particularly praising The Pleasure Garden.

Monarchy 
In 2002, to coincide with the Golden Jubilee of Queen Elizabeth II, Pullman was interviewed for a feature in The Guardian on notable republicans. According to Pullman, "The present system is unsustainable, because it is cruel. No individual and no family should be subject to the pressures of publicity and expectation that have beset the Windsors." Expressing sympathy for the young Prince William, Pullman added, "we can't have a quiet, sensible, unobtrusive sort of monarchy because of the mistakes the Windsors have made, and because of the disgusting and unredeemable nature of the tabloid press; so we shall have to have a republic. The one thing to avoid is a political president. Let's have a well-respected figure from some other walk of life, and leave politics to the prime minister and parliament." In 2010, The Atlantic described Pullman's Jesus in The Good Man Jesus and the Scoundrel Christ as "a proper republican in the Pullman sense of the word: instinctively fraternal and anti-institutional, spreading his rough-and-ready enlightenments across the horizontal axis."

Age and gender labelling of books
In 2008, Pullman led a campaign against the introduction of age bands on the covers of children's books, saying: "It's based on a one-dimensional view of growth, which regards growing older as moving along a line like a monkey climbing a stick: now you're seven, so you read these books; and now you're nine so you read these." More than 1,200 authors, booksellers, illustrators, librarians and teachers joined the campaign; Pullman's own publisher, Scholastic, agreed to his request not to put the age bands on his book covers. Joel Rickett, deputy editor of The Bookseller, said: "The steps taken by Mr Pullman and other authors have taken the industry by surprise and I think these proposals are now in the balance."

In 2014, Pullman supported the Let Books Be Books campaign to stop children's books being labelled as "for girls" or "for boys", saying: "I'm against anything, from age-ranging to pinking and blueing, whose effect is to shut the door in the face of children who might enjoy coming in. No publisher should announce on the cover of any book the sort of readers the book would prefer. Let the readers decide for themselves."

Civil liberties
Pullman has a strong commitment to traditional British civil liberties and is noted for his criticism of growing state authority and government encroachment into everyday life. In February 2009, he was the keynote speaker at the Convention on Modern Liberty in London and wrote an extended piece in The Times condemning the Labour government for its attacks on basic civil rights. Later, he and other authors threatened to stop visiting schools in protest at new laws requiring them to be vetted to work with youngsters—though officials claimed that the laws had been misinterpreted.

Public jury
In July 2011, Pullman was one of the lead campaigners signing a declaration that called for a 1,000-strong "public jury", selected at random, to draw up a "public interest first" test to ensure that power was taken away from "remote interest groups". The declaration was also signed by 56 academics, writers, trade unionists and politicians from the Labour Party, the Liberal Democrats and the Green Party.

Library closures
In October 2011, Pullman backed a campaign to stop 600 library closures in England, calling it a "war against stupidity". London Borough of Brent claimed that it was closing half of its libraries to fulfil its "exciting plans" to improve its library service. Pullman said: "All the time, you see, the council had been longing to improve the library service, and the only thing standing in the way was – the libraries."
Speaking at a conference organised by The Library Campaign and Voices for the Library, he added: The book is second only to the wheel as the best piece of technology human beings have ever invented. A book symbolises the whole intellectual history of mankind; it's the greatest weapon ever devised in the war against stupidity. Beware of anyone who tries to make books harder to get at. And that is exactly what these closures are going to do – oh, not intentionally, except in a few cases; very few people are stupid intentionally; but that will be the effect. Books will be harder to get at. Stupidity will gain a little ground.

Ebook library loans
In advance of becoming president of the Society of Authors in August 2013, Pullman led a call for authors to be fairly paid for ebook library loans. Under arrangements in force at the time, authors were paid 6p per library loan by the government for physical books, but nothing for ebook loans. In addition, the Society found that publishers had possibly been inadvertently underpaying authors for ebook loans. Altogether, this may have resulted in authors losing up to two-thirds of the income they would have received on the sale and loan of a physical book. Addressing this issue, Pullman said: New media and new forms of buying and lending are all very interesting, for all kinds of reasons, but one principle remains unchanged: authors must be paid fairly for their work. Any arrangement that doesn't acknowledge that principle is a bad one, and needs to be changed. That is our whole argument.

William Blake's cottage and memorial stone
As a long-time enthusiast of William Blake, and president of the Blake Society, Pullman led a campaign in 2014 to buy the Sussex cottage where the poet lived between 1800 and 1803, saying: Surely it isn't beyond the resources of a nation that can spend enormous amounts of money on acts of folly and unnecessary warfare, a nation that likes to boast about its literary heritage, to find the money to pay for a proper memorial and a centre for the study of this great poet and artist. Not least because this is the place where he wrote the words now often sung as an alternative (and better) national anthem, the poem known as Jerusalem: "And did those feet in ancient time". Blake's feet walked in Felpham. Let's not let this opportunity pass by.

As president of the Blake Society, on 11 August 2018, Pullman inaugurated Blake's new memorial gravestone on the site of his grave in Bunhill Fields, following a long campaign by the society.

Fees for guest authors at book festivals
In January 2016, Pullman resigned as patron of the Oxford Literary Festival after five years, saying that its continued refusal to pay authors fees for appearing as guest speakers at the event placed him in an "awkward position" because it conflicted with his presidency of the Society of Authors, which campaigns for authors to be paid for appearing at book festivals. He made the announcement on Twitter, saying that he had made lengthy attempts to persuade the Festival to pay authors, "but they won't. Time to go". Reporting Pullman's decision, UK daily newspaper The Independent noted: "The Authors' Licensing and Collecting Society found in 2014 that the average earnings of a professional full-time author is just £11,000."

Boycott of Brexit 50p coin
In January 2020, Pullman called for literate people to boycott the newly minted Brexit 50p coin due to the omission of the Oxford comma in its slogan "Peace, prosperity and friendship with all nations".  The viewpoint was supported by some, while lexicographer Susie Dent indicated it was optional and Baroness Bakewell said she had been "taught that it was wrong to use the comma in such circumstances".

Perspective on religion 
Although Pullman has stated he is "a Church of England atheist, and a 1662 Book of Common Prayer atheist, because that's the tradition I was brought up in", he has also said he is technically an agnostic. He has singled out elements of Christianity for criticism: "if there is a God, and he is as the Christians describe him, then he deserves to be put down and rebelled against." He has also acknowledged that the same could be said of all religions. 
Pullman has also referred to himself as knowingly "of the Devil's party", a reference to William Blake's revisionist view of Milton in The Marriage of Heaven and Hell. 
Pullman is a supporter of Humanists UK and an Honorary Associate of the National Secular Society. In 2011, he was given a services to Humanism award by the British Humanist Association for his contribution as a longstanding supporter.

On 15 September 2010, Pullman, along with 54 other public figures (including Stephen Fry, Professor Richard Dawkins, Terry Pratchett, Jonathan Miller and Ken Follett), signed an open letter published in The Guardian stating their opposition to Pope Benedict XVI being given "the honour of a state visit" to the UK; the letter argued that the Pope had led and condoned global abuses of human rights, leading a state which has "resisted signing many major human rights treaties and has formed its own treaties ("concordats") with many states which negatively affect the human rights of citizens of those states".

New Yorker journalist Laura Miller described Pullman as one of England's most outspoken atheists. He has characterised atheist totalitarian regimes as religions.

Alan Jacobs (of Wheaton College) said that in His Dark Materials Pullman replaced the theist world-view of John Milton's Paradise Lost with a Rousseauist one. 

The books in the series have been criticised for their attitude to religion, especially Catholicism, by the Catholic League for Religious and Civil Rights and Focus on the Family. Writing in the Catholic Herald in 1999, Leonie Caldecott cited Pullman's work as an example of fiction "far more worthy of the bonfire than Harry [Potter]" on the grounds that "[by] co-opting Catholic terminology and playing with Judaeo-Christian theological concepts, Pullman is effectively removing, among a mass audience of a highly impressionable age, some of the building blocks for future evangelisation". Pullman was flattered and asked his publisher to include quotes from Caldecott's article in his next book. In 2002, the Catholic Herald published an article by Sarah Johnson that compared Pullman to a "playground bully" whose work "attacks a religious minority". The following year, after Benedict Allen's reference to the criticism during the BBC TV series The Big Read, the Catholic Herald republished both articles and Caldecott claimed her "bonfire" comment was a joke and accused Pullman and his supporters of quoting her out of context. In a longer article for Touchstone magazine earlier in 2003, Caldecott had also described Pullman's work as "axe-grinding" and "a kind of Luciferian enterprise".

Columnist Peter Hitchens, in a 2002 article for The Mail on Sunday, accused Pullman of "killing god" and described him as "the most dangerous author in Britain" because he said in an interview: "I'm trying to undermine the basis of Christian belief." Pullman responded by posting Hitchens' article on his study wall. In that interview, which was for a February 2001 article in The Washington Post, Pullman acknowledged that a controversy would be likely to boost sales, but continued: "I'm not in the business of offending people. I find the books upholding certain values that I think are important, such as life is immensely valuable and this world is an extraordinarily beautiful place. We should do what we can to increase the amount of wisdom in the world." Hitchens also views the His Dark Materials series as a direct rebuttal of C. S. Lewis's The Chronicles of Narnia; Pullman has criticised the Narnia books as religious propaganda. Hitchens' brother Christopher Hitchens, author of God Is Not Great, praised His Dark Materials as a fresh alternative to Lewis, J. R. R. Tolkien and J. K. Rowling, describing the author as one "whose books have begun to dissolve the frontier between adult and juvenile fiction". However, he was more critical of The Good Man Jesus and the Scoundrel Christ, accusing Pullman of being a "Protestant atheist" for supporting the teachings of Christ but being critical of organised religion.

Pullman has found support from some Christians, most notably Rowan Williams, the former Archbishop of Canterbury, who argued that Pullman's attacks focus on the constraints and dangers of dogmatism and the use of religion to oppress, not on Christianity itself. Williams recommended His Dark Materials for discussion in Religious Education classes, and said that "to see large school-parties in the audience of the Pullman plays at the National Theatre is vastly encouraging". Pullman and Williams took part in a National Theatre platform debate a few days later to discuss myth, religious experience and its representation in the arts.

Donna Freitas, professor of religion at Boston University, argued that challenges to traditional images of God should be welcomed as part of a "lively dialogue about faith". The Christian writers Kurt Bruner and Jim Ware "also uncover spiritual themes within the books". Pullman's contribution to the Canongate Myth series, The Good Man Jesus and the Scoundrel Christ, was described by Mike Collett-White as "a far more direct exploration of the foundations of Christianity and the church as well as an examination of the fascination and power of storytelling".

In a 2017 interview with The Times Magazine, Pullman said: "The place religion has in our lives is a permanent one." He concluded that there was "no point in condemning [religion]", and mused that it is part of the human mind to ask philosophical questions such as the purpose of life. He reiterated that it was useless to "become censorious about [religion], to say there is no God". He also mentioned that his novel, The Book of Dust, is based on the "extreme danger of putting power into the hands of those who believe in some absolute creed, whether that is Christianity or Islam or Marxism".

Bibliography

Young adult novels

His Dark Materials series

His Dark Materials trilogy

 Northern Lights (retitled The Golden Compass in the US) (1995)
 The Subtle Knife (1997)
 The Amber Spyglass (2000)

The Book of Dust trilogy

 La Belle Sauvage (2017)
 The Secret Commonwealth (2019)
 Third book (title and publication date TBC)

Companion books
 Lyra's Oxford (2003), novella, set after The Amber Spyglass
 Once Upon a Time in the North (2008), novella, prequel to Northern Lights
 The Collectors (2014), short story, set between La Belle Sauvage and Northern Lights, first published as an audiobook and on Kindle, then hardcover (2022) 
 Serpentine (2020), novella, set after The Amber Spyglass
 The Imagination Chamber (2022), Companion, Scenes from His Dark Materials Trilogy

Sally Lockhart series
 The Ruby in the Smoke (1985)
 The Shadow in the North, first published as The Shadow in the Plate (1986)
 The Tiger in the Well (1990)
 The Tin Princess (1994)

Stand-alones
 How to Be Cool (1987)
 The Broken Bridge (1990)
 The White Mercedes (1992), re-issued as The Butterfly Tattoo (1998)

Children's novels

The New-Cut Gang series
 Thunderbolt's Waxwork (1994)
 The Gas-Fitters' Ball (1995)

Stand-alones
 Count Karlstein (1982)
 Spring-Heeled Jack (1989)
 I was a Rat! or The Scarlet Slippers (1999)
 The Scarecrow and his Servant (2004)

Other novels
 The Haunted Storm (1972)
 Galatea (1976)
 The Good Man Jesus and the Scoundrel Christ (2010), novella, part of the Canongate Myth series

Children's short stories
Collections:
 Fairy Tales From The Brothers Grimm (2012), collection of 50 short stories

Uncollected short stories:
 Clockwork, or All Wound Up (1995), novella
 The Firework-Maker's Daughter (1995), novella

Picture books
 The Wonderful Story of Aladdin and the Enchanted Lamp (1993)
 Mossycoat (1998)
 Puss in Boots: The Adventures of That Most Enterprising Feline (2000)

Comics
 The Adventures of John Blake (2008), in The DFC and The Phoenix Mystery of the Ghost Ship storyline collected by David Fickling Books and in hardcover by Scholastic Inc.

Plays
 Frankenstein (1990)
 Sherlock Holmes and the Limehouse Horror (1992)

Non-fiction
 Ancient Civilizations (1978), history 
 Using the Oxford Junior Dictionary (1978), guide 
 Daemon Voices: Essays on Storytelling (2017), essays

Adaptations

Screen adaptations
 A TV mini-series, I Was a Rat, was produced by the BBC and aired in three one-hour instalments in 2001.
 A film adaptation of The Butterfly Tattoo finished principal photography on 30 September 2007. The Butterfly Tattoo is a project, supported by Philip Pullman, to allow young artists a chance to gain experience in the film industry. The film is produced by the Dutch production company Dynamic Entertainment.
 A co-produced BBC and WGBH Boston television adaptation of The Ruby in the Smoke, starring Billie Piper and Julie Walters, was screened in the UK on BBC One on 27 December 2006, and broadcast on PBS Masterpiece Theatre in America on 4 February 2007. The television adaptation of the second book in the series, The Shadow in the North, aired on the BBC on 26 December 2007. The BBC and WGBH announced plans to adapt the next two Sally Lockhart novels, The Tiger in the Well and The Tin Princess, for television as well; however, since The Shadow in the North aired in 2007, no information has arisen regarding an adaptation of The Tiger in the Well.
 A film adaptation of Northern Lights, titled The Golden Compass, was released in December 2007 by New Line Cinema, starring Dakota Blue Richards as Lyra, along with Daniel Craig, Nicole Kidman, Eva Green, Sam Elliott and Ian McKellen.
 His Dark Materials TV series was produced by the BBC and HBO, broadcast began on BBC One on 3 November 2019.

Other adaptations

 London's Royal National Theatre staged a two-part theatrical version of His Dark Materials in December 2003. The same adaptation has since been staged by several other theatres in the UK and elsewhere.
His Dark Materials has also been adapted for radio, CD and unabridged audiobook; the unabridged audiobooks were narrated by the author.
 The Ruby In The Smoke was adapted for the stage by Reprint (now Escapade) Productions. The adaptation was written and directed by Madeleine Perham, and toured the UK in 2016, including a run at the Edinburgh Festival, finishing at the Brighton Fringe in 2017.
The Firework-Maker's Daughter was adapted into an opera, with music by David Bruce and a libretto by Glyn Maxwell. The production was premiered by the Opera Group in the UK in 2013. Pullman wrote of the opera that it was "one of the best treatments a story of [his had] ever received."

Notes

References

Further reading 
 Hugh Rayment-Pickard, The Devil's Account: Philip Pullman and Christianity (London, Darton, Longman and Todd, 2004).

 Wheat, Leonard F. Philip Pullman's His Dark Materials – A Multiple Allegory: Attacking Religious Superstition in The Lion, the Witch and the Wardrobe and Paradise Lost.
 Robert Darby: Intercision-Circumcision: His Dark Materials, a disturbing allegory of genital mutilation .
 Gerald O’Collins SJ., Philip Pullman's Jesus (London, Darton, Longman and Todd, 2010).

External links

 
 
 
 
 

1946 births
20th-century English novelists
21st-century English novelists
Academics of Oxford Brookes University
Alumni of Exeter College, Oxford
Astrid Lindgren Memorial Award winners
Audiobook narrators
British atheism activists
British Book Award winners
British secularists
Carnegie Medal in Literature winners
Commanders of the Order of the British Empire
Critics of religions
Critics of the Catholic Church
English agnostics
English atheists
English children's writers
English fantasy writers
English humanists
English male novelists
Fellows of the Royal Society of Literature
Guardian Children's Fiction Prize winners
 
Knights Bachelor
Living people
People associated with Bangor University
Writers from Norwich
Philosophers of culture
Philosophers of religion
Writers from Oxford
Presidents of the Society of Authors
British republicans